Smithella propionica is a species of bacteria, the type species of its genus. It is anaerobic, syntrophic, propionate-oxidizing bacteria, with type strain LYPT (= OCM 661T).

References

Further reading

External links

LPSN
Type strain of Smithella propionica at BacDive -  the Bacterial Diversity Metadatabase

Thermodesulfobacteriota